Alexandre 'Àlex' Granell Nogué (born 2 August 1988) is a Spanish professional footballer who plays for Belgian club Lommel S.K. as a central midfielder.

He spent the vast majority of his career with Girona, representing the club in both La Liga and Segunda División while appearing in 233 competitive matches and scoring 16 goals.

Club career

Early career
Born in Olot, Girona, Catalonia, Granell began his career with local amateurs CE Farners, and played in Tercera División the following years, representing CD Banyoles, AEC Manlleu, UE Llagostera and UE Olot, all also from his native region. With the second to last team he achieved promotion in 2011, appearing in 34 matches and scoring three goals.

Granell first arrived in the Segunda División B in 2012, after returning to Llagostera. After starting rarely, however, he moved to fellow league side Cádiz CF on 28 December 2012. On 1 August 2013, he signed with AE Prat also in the third tier.

Girona
On 30 June 2014, Granell joined Segunda División's Girona FC, signing a two-year contract. He made his debut in the competition on 24 August, starting in a 1–0 home win against Racing de Santander.

Granell scored his first professional goal on 23 November 2014, the last in a 2–0 home victory over Recreativo de Huelva. In the 2016–17 season, he contributed two goals in 31 appearances as the club achieved promotion to La Liga for the first time ever.

Granell made his debut in the top flight on 19 August 2017, starting in a 2–2 home draw against Atlético Madrid. He scored his first goal in the competition the following 31 March, as the hosts drew 1–1 with Levante UD. During most of his spell, he was team captain and was also in charge of set pieces.

On 15 August 2019, Granell agreed to a new deal through 2022.

Bolívar
On 6 October 2020, Granell moved abroad for the first time in his career, signing for Club Bolívar of the Bolivian Primera División.

References

External links

1988 births
Living people
People from Olot
Sportspeople from the Province of Girona
Spanish footballers
Footballers from Catalonia
Association football midfielders
La Liga players
Segunda División players
Segunda División B players
Tercera División players
Divisiones Regionales de Fútbol players
AEC Manlleu footballers
UE Costa Brava players
UE Olot players
Cádiz CF players
AE Prat players
Girona FC players
Bolivian Primera División players
Club Bolívar players
Challenger Pro League players
Lommel S.K. players
Catalonia international footballers
Spanish expatriate footballers
Expatriate footballers in Bolivia
Expatriate footballers in Belgium
Spanish expatriate sportspeople in Bolivia
Spanish expatriate sportspeople in Belgium